Sardara, Sàrdara in the Sardinian language,  is a comune (municipality) in the Province of South Sardinia in the Italian region Sardinia, located about  northwest of Cagliari and about  northwest of Sanluri.

Located in the Campidano plain, it is part of the Marmilla historical region.

Heritage Site
The Law was implemented by the ruling power of the castle's leaders that dominated the region, while protected its population, the clergy and trading affairs with the help of the Giudical Army, composed by soldiers and free citizens under the direction of the elite corps and the Genoese crossbowmen.

References

Cities and towns in Sardinia
Spa towns in Italy